The 2001 World Junior Curling Championships were held at The Ice Sheet at Ogden in Ogden, Utah, United States March 15–25.

Men's

Tie-breaker
 9-6

Playoffs

Women's

Playoffs

Sources

J
World Junior Curling Championships
International curling competitions hosted by the United States
2001 in sports in Utah
2001 in American sports
International sports competitions hosted by the United States
Sports competitions in Ogden, Utah
2001 in youth sport
March 2001 sports events in the United States
Curling competitions in Utah